Castalin is an ellagitannin. It can be found in oak wood and in Melaleuca quinquenervia leaves.

References 

Ellagitannins